SFCW may refer to:

Salem, Falls City and Western Railway a defunct American railroad company
Solid Fuels Coordinator for War, a predecessor of Solid Fuels Administration for War, a defunct U.S. government agency
South Florida Championship Wrestling, an American professional wrestling organization
Subsurface flow constructed wetland, a type of constructed wetland
 Stepped-Frequency Continuous-wave radar (SFCW radar)